Carolyn Ives Gilman (born 1954) is an American historian and author of science fiction and fantasy. She has been nominated for the Nebula Award three times, and the Hugo Award twice. Her short fiction has been published in a number of magazines and publications, including Fantasy and Science Fiction, Interzone, Realms of Fantasy and Full Spectrum, along with a number of "year's best" anthologies. She is also the author of science fiction novels such as Halfway Human, which is noted for its "groundbreaking" exploration of gender.

Historian

Gilman currently lives in Washington, D.C. where she works as a historian at the National Museum of the American Indian, specializing in 18th- and early 19th-century North American history. She previously worked as a historian at the Missouri Historical Society.

Writing

Her first novel, Halfway Human, was a new entry into the genre of Gender Science Fiction, portraying a world in which humans have three genders: male, female, and neuter. It has been called "one of the most compelling explorations of gender and power in recent SF" and compared favorably to the work of Ursula K. Le Guin. The book placed 2nd in the 1999 Locus Award for Best First Novel, and was nominated for the Tiptree Award. Her work is known for vivid portrayals and deconstructions of the culture of the peoples in her stories.

Bibliography

Novels
Twenty Planets series
Halfway Human (New York: Avon Books, 1998)
Arkfall (Rockville, Maryland: Phoenix Pick, 2010)
The Ice Owl (Rockville, Maryland: Phoenix Pick, 2012)
 
Isles of the Forsaken series
Isles of the Forsaken (Toronto, Ontario: ChiZine Publications, 2011)
Ison of the Isles (Toronto, Ontario: ChiZine Publications, 2012)

Short fiction 
Collections

Stories

Non-fiction
Lewis and Clark: Across the Divide (Smithsonian Books, 2003)

Critical studies and reviews of Gilman's work
Dark orbit

References

1954 births
Living people
American science fiction writers
The Magazine of Fantasy & Science Fiction people
Women science fiction and fantasy writers
20th-century American novelists
20th-century American women writers
21st-century American novelists
21st-century American women writers
American women historians
20th-century American historians
21st-century American historians
Novelists from Missouri
American women novelists